Taşburun may refer to:

 Taşburun, Karakoyunlu
 Taşburun, Bayburt 
 Taşburun, İnebolu
 Taşburun, Narman

See also 
 Barun Das (disambiguation)